The Private University in the Principality of Liechtenstein (German: Private Universität im Fürstentum Liechtenstein (UFL)) is one of the four centers for higher education in the Principality of Liechtenstein. It focuses on two main fields of study: Medical Sciences and Law. The university is located in Triesen. The university has partnerships with over 20 other institutions in the rest of the world.

History 
The university was founded in 2000 as University for Human Sciences in the Principality of Liechtenstein (German: Universität für Humanwissenschaften im Fürstentum Liechtenstein). In 2007 the Law School was established and the university was renamed.

Besides numerous law courses, the university still has its focus on medical research. It offers doctoral courses in medical science, which are eligible for candidates with master's degrees in medicine, medical technology, biomedical engineering, biology and related disciplines.

Study programs 

 Doctoral programs in Medical Sciences, students are awarded the German PhD equivalent Dr. scient. med.
 Doctoral programs in Law, students are awarded the German PhD equivalent Dr. iur.

External links

 the official website: Private University in the Principality of Liechtenstein
 Fürstentum Liechtenstein

Education in Liechtenstein
Educational organizations based in Liechtenstein
Educational institutions established in 2000
2000 establishments in Liechtenstein